The Japanese School of Guangzhou is a Japanese international school in Tianhe District, Guangzhou, Guangdong, China. It was established in April 1995 (Heisei year 7). On June 13, 1995, the Ministry of Education of China approved the establishment of the school.

As of May 2021, there were 267 students enrolled at the Japanese School of Guangzhou.

See also
 Japanese people in China
Mainland China-aligned Chinese international schools in Japan:
 Kobe Chinese School
 Yokohama Yamate Chinese School

References

Further reading

 Osaki, Hirofumi (大崎 博史 Ōsaki Hirofumi; 国立特殊教育総合研究所教育相談部). "中国・広州日本人学校,香港・香港日本人学校小学部香港校,台湾・台北日本人学校における特別支援教育の実情と教育相談支援" (Archive). 世界の特殊教育 21, 57–63, 2007–03. National Institute of Special Needs Education (独立行政法人国立特別支援教育総合研究所). - See profile at CiNii.

 "广州建日本人学校." Guangzhou Daily. December 11, 2002.

External links

  Japanese School of Guangzhou
  Japanese School of Guangzhou (geocities.co.jp/NeverLand/1205/) (Archive)

Guangzhou
1995 establishments in China
Educational institutions established in 1995
International schools in Guangzhou
Private schools in Guangdong
Tianhe District